William Vann Rogers, generally known as Will Rogers Jr. (October 20, 1911 – July 9, 1993), was an American politician, writer, and newspaper publisher. He was the eldest son of humorist Will Rogers (1879–1935) and Betty Blake Rogers (1879–1944). He was a Democratic U. S. Representative from California from January 3, 1943, until May 23, 1944, when he resigned to return to the United States Army.

Early life and military service

Rogers was born in New York City, where his father was performing.  He grew up in Los Angeles, and attended school there.  He received a Bachelor of Arts degree from Stanford University in 1935.  On completing his studies, he served as publisher of the Beverly Hills Citizen newspaper, a role in which he continued until 1953.  He had been commissioned a second lieutenant through the Reserve Officers' Training Corps, but did not go on active duty.  With U.S. entry into World War II, however, he enlisted as a private in June 1942, and was commissioned in the field artillery the following month and assigned to the 893rd Tank Destroyer Battalion.

Congress and return to active duty
While on active duty, Rogers was elected to the House of Representatives from California, and was sworn into office on January 3, 1943. He served in the 78th Congress.  He did not complete his term, however, returning to active duty in the Army after resigning from Congress on May 23, 1944.

As part of his confidential 1943 report for the British government about the United States House Committee on Foreign Affairs, Foreign Office analyst Isaiah Berlin described Rogers’ political leanings and his prospective post-war positions regarding world order and, more specifically, the British Empire:A new-comer to the House. Son of a very celebrated father. A sincere and somewhat impassioned young man who believes strongly in the Wallace type of internationalism and in cooperation with the United Nations. A trifle callow and politically inexperienced, he will undoubtedly be a vigorous and enthusiastic champion of all-out post-war co-operation with the United Nations. His fervent adherence to the liberal ideals of the "New Republic" may tend to make him critical of the British Empire.

After his resignation, Rogers was assigned to the 814th Tank Destroyer Battalion and served in the European campaign in George Patton's Third United States Army. Rogers was wounded in action and also received a Bronze Star. He was released from active duty on March 1, 1946.

Postwar politics
Later in 1946, Rogers won the Democratic nomination for US Senator from California, but he lost in the November general election to the incumbent senator, William Knowland. (Coincidentally, both men would eventually die by suicide.)

Rogers was a delegate to the Democratic National Convention in 1948, 1952, and 1956. Other government service included terms as a member of the California State Parks Commission (1958–1962, chairman 1960–1962), and special assistant to the Commission on Indian Affairs during the Johnson administration (1967–1969).

Acting
Rogers had a minor career as an actor and was most noted for playing his father (whom he closely resembled), particularly in The Story of Will Rogers (1952), Wild Heritage (1958) in which he played a judge, and in 1982 (in voice only) in The American Adventure at Disney's Epcot in Florida. He also appeared frequently in the 1950s television anthology series, Schlitz Playhouse of Stars.  Rogers starred as "Tom Brewster" in The Boy from Oklahoma, a 1954 Western film directed by Michael Curtiz, the basis for the 1957 television series Sugarfoot, although the producers of that series chose to cast Will Hutchins in Rogers' part. Earlier, in 1953-1954, he starred too in Rogers of the Gazette, a CBS Radio series that lasted one season, playing the role of a small-town newspaper owner.  Also for one season, in 1956, he hosted The Morning Show on CBS Television but was replaced by Jimmy Dean. He was one of several actors as well to host syndicated reruns of the television anthology series Death Valley Days, with the episodes he hosted airing under the title The Pioneers.

Later years and death
In his later years, Rogers retired to his ranch at Tubac, Arizona. In poor health after suffering several strokes, having heart problems, and having had hip replacements, Rogers died by suicide in 1993 at the age of 81. He was buried next to his wife in the Tubac Cemetery. Rogers was survived by his two sons, Clem Adair Rogers and Carl Connell Rogers and his brother, James Rogers.

See also
List of Native Americans in the United States Congress

References
See also Standing on the Shadow - The Will Rogers, Jr. Story,
Lyle Johnston (2019) privately printed.

External links
 Rogers' World War II service at the History Net
 Profile of Rogers in the context of his efforts on behalf of Jews in World War II
 
 
 

|-

1911 births
1993 deaths
20th-century American male actors
20th-century American politicians
American actor-politicians
United States Army personnel of World War II
American male film actors
American politicians who committed suicide
Cherokee Nation members of the United States House of Representatives
Male actors from New York (state)
Democratic Party members of the United States House of Representatives from California
Military personnel from New York City
Native American members of the United States Congress
Politicians from New York City
Stanford University alumni
Suicides in Arizona
United States Army officers
W
1993 suicides
20th-century Native Americans